Kunzakh is a rural locality (a selo) in Igalinsky Selsoviet, Gumbetovsky District, Republic of Dagestan, Russia. The population was 362 as of 2010. There are 3 streets.

Geography 
Kunzakh is located 26 km southeast of Mekhelta (the district's administrative centre) by road. Tantari and Kakhabroso are the nearest rural localities.

References 

Rural localities in Gumbetovsky District